Mary Lynn Realff (born 1965) is an American mechanical engineer and materials scientist specializing in the mechanical properties of textiles. She is an associate professor in the School of Materials Science and Engineering at Georgia Tech, and co-director of the Georgia Tech Center for Women, Science, and Technology. Beyond her research on textiles, she is also known for her explorations of group work in engineering education.

Realff graduated in 1987 from Georgia Tech, with a bachelor's degree in textile engineering. She earned a Ph.D. from the Massachusetts Institute of Technology in 1994. She was elected as a Fellow of the American Society of Mechanical Engineers in 2007, at which time she was serving as a program director for Materials Processing and Manufacturing at the National Science Foundation.

References

External links

1965 births
Living people
American mechanical engineers
American materials scientists
American women engineers
Textile engineers
Engineering educators
Georgia Tech alumni
Massachusetts Institute of Technology faculty
Fellows of the American Society of Mechanical Engineers